D. Yasodha (27 March 1944 – 27 December 2020) was an Indian politician and four times Member of Legislative assembly. She was elected to Tamil Nadu legislative assembly from Sriperumbudur constituency 1980, 1984, 2001 and 2006 elections as an Indian National Congress candidate.

Yasodha died on 27 December 2020, in Chennai due to illness.

Electoral performance

References 

Indian National Congress politicians from Tamil Nadu
2020 deaths
People from Kanchipuram district
1944 births
Tamil Nadu MLAs 1985–1989